V7 may refer to:

Electronics
 Vivo V7, a smartphone by Vivo

Science and technology

Chemicals
 ATC code V07 All other non-therapeutic products, a subgroup of the Anatomical Therapeutic Chemical Classification System

Communications
 V.7, an ITU-T recommendation for data communication
 , also sent as

Computing
 Version 7 Unix, a reference to the seventh edition of Research Unix from 1979
 UNIX V7, a brand mark by The Open Group for compliance with the Single UNIX Specification, Version 4 (SUSv4)
 V7 Ltd, a British artificial intelligence company

Transportation

Automobiles
 Brilliance V7, a Chinese mid-size SUV
 Changan Alsvin V7, a Chinese subcompact sedan
 Hanteng V7, a Chinese mid-size MPV
 Luxgen V7, a Taiwanese minivan

Aviation
 Volotea, by IATA code

Motorcycles
 Moto Guzzi V7, an Italian motorcycle

Other
V7 (political alliance), a political alliance in Suriname
V7 (application), an application by Trans 7
V-7 Navy College Training Program, within the United States Naval Reserve Midshipmen's School during 1940–1945
The Marshall Islands, by ITU callsign prefix
V7, notation for a major-minor dominant seventh chord built on the fifth degree